Erizada is a genus of moths of the family Nolidae.

Species
Erizada lichenaria Walker, 1865
Erizada rufa Hampson 1905

References

Nolidae